Clubul Sportiv Bihorul Beiuș, commonly known as Bihorul Beiuș, is a Romanian professional football club based in Beiuș, Romania. The club was founded in 1921 and the team currently competes in the Liga IV.

History
Clubul Sportiv Bihorul Beiuș was founded on 7 July 1921 as Aurora Beiuș by a group of young players led by professor Ioan Buşiţia. It was considered the most representative club of the Beiuș Depression and the city of Beiuș.

The team evolved for the most part of its existence in Liga IV – Bihor County, with the first appearance in national football in the 1978–79 season of Divizia C, finishing on 5th place in the 9th series. This first season was followed by another 4 seasons for the team in Divizia C: 1979–80, 1980–81, 1981–82 and 1982–83, but with weaker rankings. At the end of 1982–83 season, the team was relegated back to Liga IV.

Beiușenii returned in Divizia C in 1985 under the name of Gloria Beiuș and remained at this level until 1990, but with no notable performances. In the middle of the 1989–90 season the club was liquidated, but was restarted in 1996 as CF Bihorul Beiuș at the initiative of a group of 14 people, including the mayor of Beiuș from that period, Octavian Codreanu.

The club was promoted back to Diviza C in 2004 after 14 years of absence, this time under the name of Bihorul Beiuș. The team has been a constant presence at this level and at the end of the 2008–09 Liga III the club showed off its best performance, coming in 5th place at its debut in Liga III. Then at the end of the 2011–12 Liga III season Bihorul Beiuș finished in 3rd place earning the best performance in the history of the club. Due to a lack of solid funding during that same summer the team chose to withdraw from Liga III and join Liga IV.

After the withdrawal, the club was reorganized at the management level and started to put more emphasis on youth growth. At the end of the 2014–15 season the team was crowned vice-champions of Romania at the U–21 level for teams belonging to amateur football. Also at the end of the 2016–17 season the senior squad finished in 2nd place and the U–21 squad was crowned the champion of Bihor County for the third consecutive year.

Stadium
The club plays its home matches on Francsic Matei Stadium from Beiuș.

Rivalries
Bihorul Beiuș has had several rivalries over time, especially with teams from the Beiuș Depression. The main rivals were the two main teams from Ștei, a small industrial town, Minerul Ștei and Oțelul Ștei, both common presences in Liga III and Liga IV. After the fall of the mining and steel industry both teams were dissolved and a new team was formed, CSO Ștei, which is now the main rival of Bihorul Beiuș.

Honours

Leagues
Liga IV – Bihor County
Winners (4): 1952, 1974–75, 1977–78, 1984–85
Runners-up (2): 2003–04, 2016–17
Liga V – Bihor County
Winners (1): 2012–13

Cups
Cupa României  – Bihor County
Runners-up (1): 2016–17

Other performances 
 18 seasons in Liga III
 Best finish in Liga III: 3rd (2011–12)

Players

First-team squad

  Juniori antrenori :u11 Sorin Olteanu u13 Rusu Marinel Călin u15:Nicolae Mihoc u19: Ciobris George

Club officials

Board of directors

Current technical staff

References

External links

Football clubs in Bihor County
Beiuș
Association football clubs established in 1921
Liga III clubs
Liga IV clubs
1921 establishments in Romania